Delias ennia, the yellow-banded Jezebel, is a butterfly in the family Pieridae. It is found in Australia, Indonesia, Papua New Guinea and several surrounding islands.

The wingspan is 50 mm.

The larvae feed on Notothixos leiophyllus. The larvae spread silk around the leaves where they are feeding.

Subspecies
Delias ennia ennia
Delias ennia mysolensis Rothschild, 1915 (Waigeu, north-eastern West Irian, northern West Irian)
Delias ennia multicolor Joicey & Noakes, 1915 (Misool Island)
Delias ennia iere Grose-Smith, 1900 (Noemfoor Island)
Delias ennia jobiana  (Oberthür, 1894)  (Jobi Island)
Delias ennia oetakwensis Rothschild, 1915 (West Irian (Snow Mountains))
Delias ennia xelianthe Grose-Smith, 1900 (Papua (Milne Bay))
Delias ennia saturata Rothschild, 1915 (Goodenough Island)
Delias ennia limbata Rothschild, 1915 (Tagula Island, Louisiades)
Delias ennia nigidius Miskin, 1884 - Nigidius Jezabel (Cairns to Queensland)
Delias ennia tindalii Joicey & Talbot, 1926 (Queensland)

External links
Australian Insects
Australian Faunal Directory

ennia
Butterflies of Indonesia
Butterflies described in 1867
Butterflies of Oceania
Taxa named by Alfred Russel Wallace